L'Avenue is a mixed-use skyscraper complex in Montreal, Quebec, Canada. It is located across from the Bell Centre in downtown Montreal, on Avenue des Canadiens-de-Montréal between de la Montagne Street and Drummond Street.

The tower has 350 condos, with a hotel and/or office space making up the lower floors. Excavation work began in December 2017, and was completed in 2020.

At 50 floors and 184 metres (or approximately 603 feet), it became the sixth tallest building in the city, and the tallest residential tower in Canada east of Toronto. Despite the same number of floors, the Tour des Canadiens across the street measures approximately 167 metres (or approximately 548 feet), placing it as the second tallest residential building and seventh tallest in the city overall. It is the tallest building erected in Montreal since 1992.

References

External links
 Official website - L'Avenue

Skyscrapers in Montreal
Downtown Montreal
Residential condominiums in Canada
Residential skyscrapers in Canada